McChesney Simon (born 20 September 1960) is an Antiguan cricketer. He played in eight first-class and four List A matches for the Leeward Islands from 1985 to 1992.

See also
 List of Leeward Islands first-class cricketers

References

External links
 

1960 births
Living people
Antigua and Barbuda cricketers
Leeward Islands cricketers